Gregorio Magalotti (died 1537) was a Roman Catholic prelate who served as Bishop of Chiusi (1534–1537)
and Bishop of Lipari (1532–1534).

Biography
On 23 August 1532, Gregorio Magalotti was appointed Bishop of Lipari by Pope Clement VII.

He served as Governor of the City of Rome from 1 April 1532 to 14 September 1534. While he was governor, he wrote a treatise on the difficult subject of safe-conducts and ambassadorial immunities. It was published after his death, and was endorsed by Pope Sixtus V (1585–1590).

On 20 August 1534, he was appointed Bishop of Chiusi by Pope Clement VII. He enjoyed the prerogatives of Bishop of Chiusi until his death in September 1537, though the popes employed him elsewhere.

References

External links and additional sources
 (for Chronology of Bishops) 
 (for Chronology of Bishops) 
 (for Chronology of Bishops) 
 (for Chronology of Bishops) 

16th-century Italian Roman Catholic bishops
Bishops appointed by Pope Clement VII
1537 deaths
Bishops of Chiusi